Islands of Four Mountains  is an island grouping of the Aleutian Islands in Alaska, United States. The chain includes, from west to east, Amukta, Chagulak, Yunaska, Herbert, Carlisle, Chuginadak, Uliaga, and Kagamil islands. This island chain is located between Amukta Pass and the Andreanof Islands to the west, and Samalga Pass and the Fox Islands to the east. These islands have a total land area of 210.656 sq mi (545.596 km2) and have no permanent population. The two largest islands are Yunaska and Chuginadak.  Chuginadak is mainly made up of the active volcano Mount Cleveland.

The name is translated from Russian Четырехсопочные Острова (Ostrova Chetyre Soposhnye) meaning "Islands of Four Volcanoes" (Sarichev, 1826, map 3). The early Russian explorers named the islands by this term because of four prominent volcanoes, each located on a separate island. The Aleut name Unigun (Uniiĝun in the modern Aleut orthography) was reported in 1940 by Father Veniaminov. There appears to be confusion regarding the names of these islands, possibly because only four of the five are on most early maps and charts.
This is the first island in the Aleutian time zone, 1 hour behind Alaska with daylight saving time .

References

 
Islands of Aleutians West Census Area, Alaska
Islands of the Aleutian Islands
Islands of Alaska
Islands of Unorganized Borough, Alaska